John Agnew may refer to:
 John Agnew (Prince Edward Island politician) (1854–1928), Canadian merchant and politician from Prince Edward Island
 John Agnew (New Brunswick politician) (c. 1727–1812), loyalist minister and politician in New Brunswick
 John Agnew (footballer) (1935–2002), English footballer
 John Hume Agnew (1863–1908), Canadian provincial treasurer for Manitoba
 John A. Agnew (born 1949), British-American political geographer
 John Stuart Agnew (born 1949), British MEP
Sir John Stuart Agnew, 3rd Baronet (1879–1957), one of Agnew baronets
Sir John Anthony Stuart Agnew, 4th Baronet (1914–1993), one of Agnew baronets
Sir John Agnew, 6th Baronet (1950–2011), one of Agnew baronets
 John Alexander Agnew (1872–1939), New Zealand mining engineer and philatelist
 John Holmes Agnew (1804–1865), professor of ancient languages and Presbyterian clergyman